Zoya Nasir is a Pakistani actress, entrepreneur, model and beautician. She made her acting debut with a lead role in ARY Digital's crime drama Hania and later appeared in Deewangi. Zoya then did the role of Narmeen in Hum TV's Dobara and later she portrayed the role of Sameen in ARY Digital's drama Mere Humsafar.

Personal life 
Zoya belongs to a film family. Her father is a renowned screen writer with a Guinness Book of World Record of most number of movies written (who also wrote Maula Jutt and the Legend of Maula Jutt). Her mother Amna Ulfat is a politician and currently she is a member of the Censor Board of Pakistan. Her late grandfather Ghulam Hussain was also a movie director and actor while her grandmother's name was Khatija Begum. Zoya pursued her passion as a beautician and has a salon in Lahore by the name of Sasha's by Zoya Nasir.

Filmography

Television series

Web series

Film

References

External links 
 
 

1990 births
Pakistani television actresses
Living people
21st-century Pakistani actresses
Pakistani female models
Pakistani film actresses